The 52nd Annual Grammy Awards took place on January 31, 2010, at Staples Center in Los Angeles honoring the best in music for the recording year beginning October 1, 2008 through September 30, 2009. Neil Young was honored as the 2010 MusiCares Person of the Year on January 29, two days prior to the Grammy telecast. Nominations announced on December 2, 2009. The show was moved to January to avoid competing against the 2010 Winter Olympics in Vancouver. Only ten of the 109 awards were received during the broadcast.  The remaining awards were given during the un-televised portion of the ceremony which preceded the broadcast.

Beyoncé, who also received the most nominations, with ten, won a total of six awards breaking the record for most wins by a female artist in one night. Taylor Swift won four while The Black Eyed Peas, Jay-Z and Kings of Leon won three. Artists who won two awards include  A. R. Rahman, Colbie Caillat, Eminem, Kanye West, Lady Gaga, Maxwell, Jason Mraz and Rihanna. Judas Priest, AC/DC, and Imogen Heap each won a Grammy for the first time in their careers.

Taylor Swift's Fearless was awarded the Grammy Award for Album of the Year, at the time the youngest to win the award at age 20. "Use Somebody" by rock band Kings of Leon won the Grammy Award for Record of the Year, while "Single Ladies" by songwriters Thaddis Harrell, Beyoncé Knowles, Terius Nash and Christopher Stewart, was honored with Grammy Award for Song of the Year. Zac Brown Band was presented with the Grammy Award for Best New Artist, becoming the fourth country music act to ever win the award. They follow behind LeAnn Rimes in 1997, Shelby Lynne in 2001 and Carrie Underwood in 2007.

Performers 

The following performed:

Presenters 

The following presented:

 Simon Baker
 Kristen Bell
 Justin Bieber
 Jeff Bridges
 Jonas Brothers
 Stephen Colbert
 Alice Cooper
 Sheryl Crow
 Kaley Cuoco
 Miley Cyrus
 Mos Def
 Plácido Domingo
 Robert Downey Jr.
 Josh Duhamel
 Wyclef Jean
 Norah Jones
 Juanes
 Kesha
 Miranda Lambert
 John Legend
 LL Cool J
 Jennifer Lopez
 Ricky Martin
 Lea Michele
 Chris O'Donnell
 Katy Perry
 Lionel Richie
 Adam Sandler
 Carlos Santana
 Ryan Seacrest
 Seal
 Ringo Starr
 Quentin Tarantino
 Keith Urban

Awards

General 
Album of the Year
 Fearless – Taylor Swift Colbie Caillat, featured artist; Nathan Chapman & Taylor Swift, producers; Chad Carlson, Nathan Chapman & Justin Niebank, engineers/mixers; Hank Williams, mastering engineer I Am... Sasha Fierce – Beyoncé
 Bangladesh, Ian Dench, D-Town, Toby Gad, Sean Garrett, Amanda Ghost, Jim Jonsin, Beyoncé Knowles, Rico Love, Dave McCracken, Terius Nash, Radio Killa, Stargate, Christopher Stewart, Ryan Tedder & Wayne Wilkins, producers; Jim Caruana, Mikkel S. Eriksen, Toby Gad, Kuk Harrell, Jim Jonsin, Jaycen Joshua, Dave Pensado, Radio Killa, Mark "Spike" Stent, Ryan Tedder, Brian Thomas, Marcos Továr, Miles Walker & Wayne Wilkins, engineers/mixers; Tom Coyne, mastering engineer
 The E.N.D. – The Black Eyed Peas
 apl.de.ap, Jean Baptiste, Printz Board, DJ Replay, Funkagenda, David Guetta, Keith Harris, & will.i.am, producers; Dylan Dresdow, Padraic Kerin & will.i.am, engineers/mixers; Chris Bellman, mastering engineer
 The Fame – Lady Gaga
 Flo Rida, Colby O'Donis & Space Cowboy, featured artists; Brian & Josh, Rob Fusari, Martin Kierszenbaum, RedOne & Space Cowboy, producers; 4Mil, Robert Orton, RedOne, Dave Russell & Tony Ugval, engineers/mixers; Gene Grimaldi, mastering engineer
 Big Whiskey and the GrooGrux King – Dave Matthews Band
 Jeff Coffin, Tim Reynolds & Rashawn Ross, featured artists; Rob Cavallo, producer; Chris Lord-Alge & Doug McKean, engineers/mixers; Ted Jensen, mastering engineer

Record of the Year
 "Use Somebody" – Kings of Leon Jacquire King & Angelo Petraglia, producers; Jacquire King, engineer/mixer "You Belong With Me" – Taylor Swift
 Nathan Chapman & Taylor Swift, producers; Chad Carlson & Justin Niebank, engineers/mixers
 "Halo" – Beyoncé
 Beyoncé Knowles & Ryan Tedder, producers; Jim Caruana, Mark "Spike" Stent & Ryan Tedder, engineers/mixers
 "I Gotta Feeling" – The Black Eyed Peas
 David Guetta & Frederick Riesterer, producers; will.i.am, Dylan "3-D" Dresdow & Padraic "Padlock" Kerin, engineers/mixers
 "Poker Face" – Lady Gaga
 Lady Gaga, RedOne, producer; Robert Orton, RedOne & Dave Russell, engineers/mixers

Song of the Year
 "Single Ladies (Put a Ring on It)" Thaddis Harrell, Beyoncé Knowles, Terius Nash & Christopher Stewart, songwriters (Beyoncé) "Poker Face"
 Lady Gaga & RedOne, songwriters (Lady Gaga)
 "Pretty Wings"
 Hod David & Musze, songwriters (Maxwell)
 "Use Somebody"
 Caleb Followill, Jared Followill, Matthew Followill & Nathan Followill, songwriters (Kings of Leon)
 "You Belong with Me"
 Liz Rose & Taylor Swift, songwriters (Taylor Swift)

Best New Artist
 Zac Brown Band Keri Hilson
 MGMT
 Silversun Pickups
 The Ting Tings

 Pop 
Best Female Pop Vocal Performance
 "Halo" - Beyoncé "Hometown Glory" - Adele
 "Hot n Cold" - Katy Perry
 "Sober" - Pink
 "You Belong with Me" - Taylor Swift

Best Male Pop Vocal Performance
 "Make It Mine" - Jason Mraz "This Time" - John Legend
 "Love You" - Maxwell
 "If You Don't Know Me by Now" - Seal
 "All About the Love Again" - Stevie Wonder

Best Pop Performance by a Duo or Group with Vocals
 "I Gotta Feeling" - The Black Eyed Peas "We Weren't Born to Follow" - Bon Jovi
 "Never Say Never" - The Fray
 "Sara Smile" - Daryl Hall & John Oates
 "Kids" - MGMT

Best Pop Collaboration with Vocals
 "Lucky" - Jason Mraz & Colbie Caillat
 "Breathe" - Taylor Swift & Colbie Caillat
 "Sea of Heartbreak" - Rosanne Cash & Bruce Springsteen
 "Love Sex Magic" - Ciara & Justin Timberlake
 "Baby, It's Cold Outside" - Norah Jones & Willie Nelson

Best Pop Instrumental Performance
 "Throw Down Your Heart" - Béla Fleck
 "Bésame Mucho" - Herb Alpert
 "The Fire" - Imogen Heap
 "Phoenix Rise" - Maxwell
 "Funk Joint" - Marcus Miller

Best Pop Instrumental Album
 Potato Hole - Booker T. Jones In Boston - Chris Botti
 Legacy - Hiroshima
 Modern Art - The Rippingtons & Russ Freeman
 Down the Wire - Spyro Gyra

Best Pop Vocal Album
 The E.N.D. - The Black Eyed Peas Breakthrough - Colbie Caillat
 All I Ever Wanted - Kelly Clarkson
 The Fray - The Fray
 Funhouse - Pink

 Dance 

Best Dance Recording
 "Poker Face" - Lady Gaga RedOne, producer; Robert Orton, RedOne & Dave Russell, mixers "Boom Boom Pow" - The Black Eyed Peas
 will.i.am, Jean Baptiste & Poet Name Life, producers ; Dylan Dresdow, mixer
 "When Love Takes Over" - David Guetta & Kelly Rowland
 David Guetta & Frédéric Riesterer, producers; Veronica Ferraro, mixer
 "Celebration" - Madonna
 Madonna & Paul Oakenfold, producers; Demacio Castellon, mixer
 "Womanizer" - Britney Spears
 K. Briscoe, producer; Serban Ghenea, mixer

Best Electronic/Dance Album
 The Fame - Lady Gaga Divided By Night - The Crystal Method
 One Love - David Guetta
 Party Rock - LMFAO

 Traditional Pop 
Best Traditional Pop Vocal Album
 Michael Bublé Meets Madison Square Garden - Michael Bublé A Swingin' Christmas - Tony Bennett
 Your Songs - Harry Connick, Jr.
 Liza's at The Palace.... - Liza Minnelli
 American Classic - Willie Nelson

 Rock 
Best Solo Rock Vocal Performance
 "Working on a Dream" - Bruce Springsteen "Beyond Here Lies Nothin'" - Bob Dylan
 "Change in the Weather" - John Fogerty
 "Dreamer" - Prince
 "Fork in the Road" - Neil Young

Best Rock Performance by a Duo or Group with Vocal
 "Use Somebody" - Kings of Leon "Can't Find My Way Home" - Eric Clapton & Steve Winwood
 "Life in Technicolor II" - Coldplay
 "21 Guns" - Green Day
 "I'll Go Crazy If I Don't Go Crazy Tonight" - U2

Best Hard Rock Performance
 "War Machine" - AC/DC "What I've Done [Live]" - Linkin Park
 "Check My Brain" - Alice in Chains
 "The Unforgiven III" - Metallica
 "Burn It to the Ground" - Nickelback

Best Metal Performance
 "Dissident Aggressor (live)" - Judas Priest "Set to Fail" - Lamb of God
 "Head Crusher" - Megadeth
 "Señor Peligro (live)" - Ministry
 "Hate Worldwide" - Slayer

Best Rock Instrumental Performance
 "A Day in the Life" - Jeff Beck "Warped Sister" - Booker T. Jones
 "Playing With Fire" - Brad Paisley
 "Mr. Surfer Goes Jazzin" - Brian Setzer Orchestra
 "Now We Run" - Steve Vai

Best Rock Song
 "Use Somebody" - Kings of Leon Caleb Followill, Jared Followill, Matthew Followill & Nathan Followill, songwriters "The Fixer" - Pearl Jam
 Matt Cameron, Stone Gossard, Mike McCready & Eddie Vedder, songwriters
 "I'll Go Crazy If I Don't Go Crazy Tonight" - U2
 Bono, Adam Clayton, The Edge & Larry Mullen, Jr., songwriters
 "21 Guns" - Green Day
 Billie Joe Armstrong, Mike Dirnt & Tré Cool, songwriters
 "Working on a Dream" - Bruce Springsteen
 Bruce Springsteen, songwriter

Best Rock Album
 21st Century Breakdown - Green Day Black Ice - AC/DC
 Live from Madison Square Garden - Eric Clapton & Steve Winwood
 Big Whiskey and the GrooGrux King - Dave Matthews Band
 No Line on the Horizon - U2

 Alternative 
Best Alternative Music Album
 Wolfgang Amadeus Phoenix - Phoenix Everything That Happens Will Happen Today - David Byrne & Brian Eno
 The Open Door EP - Death Cab For Cutie
 Sounds of the Universe - Depeche Mode
 It's Blitz! - Yeah Yeah Yeahs

 R&B 
Best Female R&B Vocal Performance 
 "Single Ladies (Put a Ring on It)" - Beyoncé "It Kills Me" - Melanie Fiona
 "That Was Then" - Lalah Hathaway
 "Goin' Thru Changes" - Ledisi
 "Lions, Tigers & Bears" - Jazmine Sullivan

Best Male R&B Vocal Performance
 "Pretty Wings" - Maxwell "The Point Of It All" - Anthony Hamilton
 "SoBeautiful" - Musiq Soulchild
 "Under" - Pleasure P
 "There Goes My Baby" - Charlie Wilson

Best R&B Performance by a Duo or Group with Vocals
 "Blame It" - Jamie Foxx & T-Pain "Chocolate High" - India.Arie & Musiq Soulchild
 "IfULeave" - Musiq Soulchild & Mary J. Blige
 "Higher Ground" - Robert Randolph & The Clark Sisters
 "Love Has Finally Come at Last" - Calvin Richardson & Ann Nesby

Best Traditional R&B Vocal Performance
 "At Last" - Beyoncé "Soul Music" - Anthony Hamilton
 "Don't Let Me Be Lonely Tonight" - Boney James & Quinn
 "Sow Love" - Ann Nesby
 "Woman Gotta Have It" - Calvin Richardson
Best Urban/Alternative Performance 
 "Pearls" - India.Arie & Dobet Gnahore "Daykeeper" - The Foreign Exchange
 "All Matter" - Robert Glasper & Bilal
 "A Tale Of Two" - Eric Roberson, Ben O'Neill & Michelle Thompson
 "Blend" - Tonex

Best R&B Song
 "Single Ladies (Put a Ring on It)" - Beyoncé Thaddis Harrell, Beyoncé, Terius Nash & Christopher Stewart songwriters "Blame It" - Jamie Foxx & T-Pain
 James T. Brown, John Conte, Jr., Jamie Foxx, Christopher Henderson, Brandon R. Melanchon, Breyon Prescott, T-Pain & Nathan L. Walker songwriters
 "Lions, Tigers & Bears" - Jazmine Sullivan
 Salaam Remi & Jazmine Sullivan songwriters
 "Pretty Wings" - Maxwell
 Hod David & Musze songwriters
 "Under" - Pleasure P
 D. Babbs, L. Bereal, M. Cooper, A. Dixon, J. Franklin, T. Jones, R. New & K. Stephens songwriters
Best R&B Album
 BLACKsummers'night - Maxwell The Point Of It All - Anthony Hamilton
 Testimony: Vol. 2, Love & Politics - India.Arie
 Turn Me Loose - Ledisi
 Uncle Charlie - Charlie Wilson
Best Contemporary R&B Album
 I Am... Sasha Fierce - Beyoncé Intuition - Jamie Foxx
 The Introduction of Marcus Cooper - Pleasure P
 Ready - Trey Songz
 Thr33 Ringz - T-Pain

 Rap 
Best Rap Solo Performance
 "D.O.A. (Death Of Auto-Tune)" – Jay-Z "Best I Ever Had" – Drake
 "Beautiful" – Eminem
 "Day 'n' Nite" – Kid Cudi
 "Casa Bey" – Mos Def

Best Rap Performance by a Duo or Group
 "Crack A Bottle" – Eminem, Dr. Dre & 50 Cent "Too Many Rappers" – Beastie Boys & Nas
 "Money Goes, Honey Stay" – Fabolous & Jay-Z
 "Make Her Say" – Kid Cudi, Kanye West & Common
 "Amazing" – Kanye West & Young Jeezy

Best Rap/Sung Collaboration
 "Run This Town" – Jay-Z, Rihanna & Kanye West "Ego" – Beyoncé & Kanye West
 "Knock You Down" – Keri Hilson, Kanye West & Ne-Yo
 "I'm on a Boat" – The Lonely Island & T-Pain
 "Dead and Gone" – T.I. & Justin Timberlake

Best Rap Song
 "Run This Town" Shawn Carter, R. Fenty, M. Riddick, Kanye West & E. Wilson, songwriters (Athanasios Alatas, songwriter) (Jay-Z, Rihanna & Kanye West) "Best I Ever Had"
 Aubrey Drake Graham, D. Hamilton & M. Samuels, songwriters (Drake)
 "Day 'n' Nite"
 S. Mescudi & O. Omishore, songwriters (Kid Cudi)
 "Dead and Gone"
 C. Harris, R. Tadross & J. Timberlake, songwriters (T.I. & Justin Timberlake)
 "D.O.A. (Death Of Auto-Tune)"
 Shawn Carter & Ernest Wilson, songwriters (Gary DeCarlo, Dale Frashuer, Paul Leka, Janko Nilovic & Dave Sucky, songwriters) (Jay-Z)

 Best Rap Album
 Relapse – Eminem Universal Mind Control – Common
 R.O.O.T.S. – Flo Rida
 The Ecstatic – Mos Def
 The Renaissance – Q-Tip

 Country 
Best Female Country Vocal Performance
 "White Horse" - Taylor Swift "Dead Flowers" - Miranda Lambert
 "I Just Call You Mine" - Martina McBride
 "Just a Dream" - Carrie Underwood
 "Solitary Thinkin'" - Lee Ann Womack

Best Male Country Vocal Performance
 "Sweet Thing" - Keith Urban "All I Ask For Anymore" - Trace Adkins
 "People Are Crazy" - Billy Currington
 "High Cost of Living" - Jamey Johnson
 "Living for the Night" - George Strait

Best Country Performance by a Duo or Group with Vocals
 "I Run to You" - Lady Antebellum "Cowgirls Don't Cry" - Brooks & Dunn
 "Chicken Fried" - Zac Brown Band
 "Here Comes Goodbye" - Rascal Flatts
 "It Happens" - Sugarland

Best Country Collaboration with Vocals
 "I Told You So" - Carrie Underwood & Randy Travis "Beautiful World" - Dierks Bentley & Patty Griffin
 "Down the Road" - Kenny Chesney & Mac McAnally
 "Start a Band" - Brad Paisley & Keith Urban
 "Everything But Quits" - Lee Ann Womack & George Strait

Best Country Instrumental Performance 
 "Producer's Medley" - Steve Wariner "Under The (Five) Wire" - Alison Brown
 "The Crystal Merchant" - The Greencards
 "Mansinneedof" - Sarah Jarosz

Best Country Song
 "White Horse" - Taylor Swift Liz Rose & Taylor Swift, songwriters "All I Ask For Anymore" - Trace Adkins
 Casey Beathard & Tim James, songwriters
 "High Cost of Living" - Jamey Johnson
 Jamey Johnson & James T. Slater, songwriters
 "I Run to You" - Lady Antebellum
 Tom Douglas, Dave Haywood, Charles Kelley & Hillary Scott, songwriters
 "People Are Crazy" - Billy Currington
 Bobby Braddock & Troy Jones, songwriters

Best Country Album
 Fearless - Taylor Swift The Foundation - Zac Brown Band
 Twang - George Strait
 Defying Gravity - Keith Urban
 Call Me Crazy - Lee Ann Womack

 New Age 
Best New Age Album
 Prayer for Compassion - David Darling Faith - Jim Brickman
 Laserium for the Soul - Henta
 In A Dream - Peter Kater, Dominic Miller, Kenny Loggins & Jaques Morelenbaum
 Impressions of the West Lake - Kitarō

 Jazz 
Best Contemporary Jazz Instrumental Album
 75 - Joe Zawinul & The Zawinul Syndicate Urbanus - Stefon Harris & Blackout
 Sounding Point - Julian Lage
 At World's Edge - Philippe Saisse
 Big Neighborhood - Mike Stern

Best Jazz Vocal Album
 Dedicated to You: Kurt Elling Sings the Music of Coltrane and Hartman - Kurt Elling No Regrets - Randy Crawford (& Joe Sample)
 So in Love - Roberta Gambarini
 Tide - Luciana Souza
 Desire - Tierney Sutton (Band)

Best Jazz Instrumental Performance
 "Dancin' 4 Chicken" - Terence Blanchard soloist "All Of You" - Gerald Clayton soloist
 "Ms. Garvey, Ms. Garvey" - Roy Hargrove soloist
 "On Green Dolphin Street" - Martial Solal soloist
 "Villa Palmeras" - Miguel Zenón soloist

Best Jazz Instrumental Album
 Five Peace Band Live - Chick Corea & John McLaughlin Five Peace Band Quartet Live - Gary Burton, Pat Metheny, Steve Swallow & Antonio Sánchez
 Brother To Brother - The Clayton Brothers
 Remembrance - John Patitucci Trio
 The Bright Mississippi - Allen Toussaint

Best Large Jazz Ensemble Album
 Book One - New Orleans Jazz Orchestra Legendary - Bob Florence Limited Edition
 Eternal Interlude - John Hollenbeck Large Ensemble
 Fun Time - Sammy Nestico And The SWR Big Band
 Lab 2009 - University of North Texas One O'Clock Lab Band

Best Latin Jazz Album
 Juntos Para Siempre - Bebo Valdés And Chucho Valdés Things I Wanted To Do - Chembo Corniel
 Áurea - Geoffrey Keezer
 Brazilliance X 4 - Claudio Roditi
 Esta Plena - Miguel Zenón

 Gospel 

 Best Gospel Performance
 "Wait on the Lord" - Donnie McClurkin & Karen Clark Sheard "Free to Be Me" - Francesca Battistelli
 "Jesus Is Love" - Heather Headley & Smokie Norful
 "I Believe" - Jonny Lang With Fisk Jubilee Singers
 "Born Again" - Third Day featuring Lacey Mosley

 Best Gospel Song
 "God in Me" - Mary Mary Featuring Kierra Sheard "Born Again" - Third Day
 "City on Our Knees" - TobyMac
 "Every Prayer" - Israel Houghton & Mary Mary
 "The Motions" - Matthew West

 Best Rock or Rap Gospel Album
 Live Revelations - Third Day The Big Picture - Da' T.R.U.T.H.
 Crash - Decyfer Down
 Innocence & Instinct - Red
 The Dash - John Wells – The Tonic

 Best Pop/Contemporary Gospel Album
 The Power Of One - Israel Houghton Speaking Louder Than Before - Jeremy Camp
 The Long Fall Back to Earth - Jars of Clay
 Love Is on the Move - Leeland
 Freedom - Mandisa

 Best Southern/Country/Bluegrass Gospel Album
 Jason Crabb - Jason Crabb Dream On - Ernie Haase & Signature Sound
 The Rock - Tracy Lawrence
 In God's Time - Barry Scott & Second Wind
 Everyday - Triumphant Quartet

 Best Traditional Gospel Album
 Oh Happy Day - Various Artists God Don't Never Change - Ashley Cleveland
 The Law Of Confession, Part I - Donald Lawrence & Co.
 Bill Hearn, Ken Levitan, Ken Pennell, Jack Rovner & Cedric Thompson, producers
 The Journey Continues - The Williams Brothers
 How I Got Over - Vickie Winans

 Best Contemporary R&B Gospel Album
 Audience Of One - Heather Headley Renewed - Sheri Jones-Moffett
 Just James - J Moss
 Smokie Norful Live - Smokie Norful
 Bold Right Life - Kierra Sheard

 Latin 

 Best Latin Pop Album
 Sin Frenos - La Quinta Estación 5to Piso - Ricardo Arjona
 Te Acuerdas... - Francisco Céspedes
 Hu Hu Hu - Natalia Lafourcade
 Gran City Pop - Paulina Rubio

 Best Latin Rock, Alternative or Urban Album
 Los de Atras Vienen Conmigo - Calle 13 Río - Aterciopelados
 Y. - Bebe
 La Luz del Ritmo - Los Fabulosos Cadillacs
 La Revolución - Wisin & Yandel

 Best Tropical Latin Album
 Ciclos - Luis Enrique Asi Soy - Isaac Delgado
 Guasábara - José Lugo Orchestra
 Gracias - Omara Portuondo
 Bach in Havana - Tiempo Libre

 Best Regional Mexican Album
 Necesito de Ti - Vicente Fernández Corazón Ranchero - Shaila Dúrcal
 Compañeras - Mariachi Reyna de Los Angeles
 10 Aniversario - Mariachi Divas de Cindy Shea
 Pegadito Al Corazón - Joan Sebastian

 Best Tejano Album
 Borders y Bailes - Los Texmaniacs Divina - Stefani Montiel
 All the Way Live - Jay Perez
 Point of View - Joe Posada
 Radiación Musical - Sunny Sauceda y Todo Eso

 Best Norteño Album
 Tu Noche con... Los Tigres del Norte - Los Tigres del Norte Dejame Soñar - Cumbre Norteña
 El Niño de Oro - El Compa Chuy
 Pese a Quien le Pese - Los Rieleros del Norte
 Soy Todo Tuyo - Los Tucánes de Tijuana

 Best Banda Album
 Tu Esclavo y Amo - Lupillo Rivera Se Nos Murio el Amor - El Guero Y Su Banda Centenario
 Mas Adelante - La Arrolladora Banda el Limón de Rene Camacho
 Derecho de Antiguedad - La Original Banda el Limón de Salvador Lizárraga

 American roots 

 Best Americana Album
 Electric Dirt - Levon Helm Together Through Life - Bob Dylan
 Willie and the Wheel - Willie Nelson & Asleep at the Wheel
 Wilco - Wilco
 Little Honey - Lucinda Williams

 Best Bluegrass Album
 The Crow: New Songs for the 5-String Banjo - Steve Martin Could We Get Any Closer? - Jim Lauderdale
 Buckaroo Blue Grass - Michael Martin Murphey
 Almost Live - Bryan Sutton And Friends
 Destination Life - Rhonda Vincent

 Best Traditional Blues Album
 A Stranger Here - Ramblin' Jack Elliott Blue Again - The Mick Fleetwood Blues Band Featuring Rick Vito
 Rough & Tough - John Hammond
 Stomp! The Blues Tonight - Duke Robillard
 Chicago Blues: A Living History - Various Artists
 Larry Skoller, producer

 Best Contemporary Blues Album
 Already Free - The Derek Trucks Band This Time - The Robert Cray Band
 The Truth According to Ruthie Foster - Ruthie Foster
 Live: Hope at the Hideout - Mavis Staples
 Back to the River - Susan Tedeschi

 Best Traditional Folk Album
 High Wide & Handsome: The Charlie Poole Project - Loudon Wainwright III Cutting Loose - David Holt And Josh Goforth
 Naked With Friends - Maura O'Connell
 Polka Cola: Music That Refreshes - Jimmy Sturr And His Orchestra
 Singing Through The Hard Times: A Tribute to Utah Phillips - Various Artists
 Jacqui Morse, Kendall Morse & Dan Schatz, producers

 Best Contemporary Folk Album
 Townes - Steve Earle Middle Cyclone - Neko Case
 Our Bright Future - Tracy Chapman
 Live - Shawn Colvin
 Secret, Profane & Sugarcane - Elvis Costello

 Best Hawaiian Music Album
 Masters of Hawaiian Slack Key Guitar, Volume 2 - Various Artists Daniel Ho, George Kahumoku, Jr., Paul Konwiser & Wayne Wong, producers He Nani - Tia Carrere & Daniel Ho
 Friends & Family Of Hawaii - Amy Hanaialii
 Nani Mau Loa: Everlasting Beauty- Ho'okena

 Best Native American Music Album
 Spirit Wind North - Bill Miller Siyotanka - Michael Brant DeMaria
 True Blue - Northern Cree
 Wind Songs - Native American Flute Solos - John Two-Hawks
 Riders of the Healing Road - Johnny Whitehorse

 Best Zydeco or Cajun Music Album
 Lay Your Burden Down - Buckwheat Zydeco Alligator Purse - Beausoleil Avec Michael Doucet
 Stripped Down - The Magnolia Sisters
 Live at 2009 New Orleans Jazz & Heritage Festival - Pine Leaf Boys
 L'Ésprit Créole - Cedric Watson et Bijou Créole

 Reggae 
Best Reggae Album
 Mind Control - Acoustic - Stephen Marley Rasta Got Soul - Buju Banton
 Brand New Me - Gregory Isaacs
 Awake - Julian Marley
 Imperial Blaze - Sean Paul

 World music 

 Best Traditional World Music Album
 Douga Mansa - Mamadou Diabate Ancient Sounds - Rahim Alhaj And Amjad Ali Khan
 Double Play - Liz Carroll & John Doyle
 La Guerra No - John Santos Y El Coro Folklórico Kindembo
 Drum Music Land - Ten Drum Art Percussion Group

 Best Contemporary World Music Album
 Throw Down Your Heart: Tales from the Acoustic Planet, Vol. 3 - Africa Sessions - Béla Fleck Welcome To Mali - Amadou & Mariam
 Day By Day - Femi Kuti
 Seya - Oumou Sangare
 Across the Divide: A Tale of Rhythm & Ancestry - Omar Sosa

 Children's 

 Best Children's Music Album
 Family Time - Ziggy Marley American Heroes #3 - Jonathan Sprout
 Banjo to Beatbox - Cathy & Marcy & Christylez Bacon
 Great Day - Milkshake
 Jumpin' & Jammin - Greg & Steve
 Pete Seeger Tribute - Ageless Kids' Songs - Buck Howdy

 Best Children's Spoken Word Album
 Aaaaah! Spooky, Scary Stories & Songs - Buck Howdy Captain Nobody - Dean Pitchford
 Nelson Mandela's Favorite African Folktales - Samuel L. Jackson, Scarlett Johansson, Helen Mirren, Forest Whitaker & Various Artists
 Sharon Gelman, Michele McGonigle & Alfre Woodard, producers
 The Phantom Tollbooth - David Hyde Pierce
 Scat - Ed Asner
 Through the Looking-Glass and What Alice Found There - Harlan Ellison

 Spoken word 
Best Spoken Word Album
 Always Looking Up - Michael J. Fox Jonathan Winters - A Very Special Time - Jonathan Winters
 The Lincoln-Douglas Debates - Richard Dreyfuss & David Strathairn
 The Maltese Falcon - Various Artists Including Michael Madsen, Sandra Oh, Edward Herrmann and OthersYuri Rasovsky
 Josh Stanton, producers
 We Can Have Peace in the Holy Land - Jimmy Carter
 Wishful Drinking - Carrie Fisher

 Comedy 

 Best Comedy Album
 A Colbert Christmas: The Greatest Gift of All! – Stephen Colbert Back from the Dead – Spinal Tap
 Internet Leaks – "Weird Al" Yankovic
 My Weakness Is Strong – Patton Oswalt
 Suckin' It for the Holidays – Kathy Griffin
 Tall, Dark & Chicano – George Lopez

 Musical show 
Best Musical Show Album
 West Side StoryDavid Caddick & David Lai producers (Leonard Bernstein composer; Stephen Sondheim lyricist) (New Broadway Cast with Matt Cavenaugh Josefina Scaglione & others)
 Ain't Misbehavin'Robert Sher, producer (Various, composers; Various, lyricist) (30th Anniversary Cast Recording With Ruben Studdard, Frenchie Davis & Others)
 Hair 9 to 5: The Musical Shrek the Musical Film, TV and other visual media 

 Best Compilation Soundtrack Album
 Slumdog Millionaire - Various Artists, A. R. Rahman (producer), P. A. Deepak (mix engineer)
 Cadillac Records - Various Artists
 Quentin Tarantino's Inglourious Basterds True Blood Twilight Best Score Soundtrack Album
 Up - Michael Giacchino The Curious Case of Benjamin Button - Alexandre Desplat
 Harry Potter and the Half-Blood Prince - Nicholas Hooper
 Milk - Danny Elfman
 Star Trek - Michael Giacchino, Varèse Sarabande

 Best Song Written For Motion Picture, Television Or Other Visual Media
 "Jai Ho" (From Slumdog Millionaire) A. R. Rahman, Sukhwinder Singh, Tanvi Shah, Mahalaxmi Iyer, Vijay Prakash, songwriters (A. R. Rahman, Gulzar & Sukhwinder Singh) "All Is Love" (From Where the Wild Things Are)
 Karen O & Nick Zinner, songwriters (Karen O & The Kids)
 "Decode" (From Twilight)
 Josh Farro, Hayley Williams & Taylor York, songwriters (Paramore)
 "Once in a Lifetime" (From Cadillac Records)
 Ian Dench, James Dring, Amanda Ghost, Beyoncé Knowles, Scott McFarnon & Jody Street, songwriters (Beyoncé)
 "The Wrestler" (From The Wrestler)
 Bruce Springsteen, songwriter (Bruce Springsteen)
"The Climb" (From Hannah Montana: The Movie)
Jessi Alexander and Jon Mabe, songwriter (Miley Cyrus)

 Composing and arranging 

 Best Instrumental Composition
 "Married Life" (From Up) Michael Giacchino, composer (Michael Giacchino) "Borat in Syracuse"
 Paquito D'Rivera, composer (Paquito D'Rivera Quintet)
 "Counting To Infinity"
 Tim Davies, composer (Tim Davies Big Band)
 "Fluffy"
 Bob Florence, composer (Bob Florence Limited Edition)
 "Ice-Nine"
 Steve Wiest, composer (University Of North Texas One O'Clock Lab Band)

 Best Instrumental Arrangement
 "West Side Story Medley" Bill Cunliffe, arranger (Resonance Big Band) "Emmanuel"
 Jeremy Lubbock, arranger (Chris Botti & Lucia Micarelli)
 "Hope"
 Vince Mendoza, arranger (Jim Beard With Vince Mendoza & The Metropole Orchestra)
 "Slings And Arrows"
 Vince Mendoza, arranger (Chuck Owen & The Jazz Surge)
 "Up With End Credits" (From Up)
 Michael Giacchino & Tim Simonec, arrangers (Michael Giacchino)

 Best Instrumental Arrangement Accompanying Vocalist(s)
 "Quiet Nights" Claus Ogerman, arranger (Diana Krall) "A Change Is Gonna Come"
 David Foster & Jerry Hey, arrangers (Seal)
 "Dedicated To You"
 Laurence Hobgood, arranger (Kurt Elling)
 "In The Still of the Night"
 Thomas Zink, arranger (Anne Walsh)
 "My One And Only Thrill"
 Vince Mendoza, arranger (Melody Gardot)

 Package 

 Best Recording Package
 Everything That Happens Will Happen Today Stefan Sagmeister, art director (David Byrne & Brian Eno)
 Back from the Dead Brian Porizek, art director (Spinal Tap)
 Middle Cyclone Neko Case & Kathleen Judge, art directors (Neko Case)
 Splitting Adam Jeff Harrison, art director (Splitting Adam)
 Tathagata Szu Wei Cheng & Hui Chen Huang, art directors (Various Artists)

 Best Boxed or Special Limited Edition Package
 Neil Young The Archives Vol. 1 1963-1972 Gary Burden, Jenice Heo & Neil Young, art directors (Neil Young)
 A Cabinet of Curiosities Mathieu Bitton & Scott Webber, art directors (Jane's Addiction)
 The Clifford Ball Masaki Koike, art director (Phish)
 Everything That Happens Will Happen Today Stefan Sagmeister, art director (David Byrne & Brian Eno)
 Lost in the Sound of Separation (Deluxe Edition)
 Jordan Butcher, art director (Underoath)

 Album notes 

 Best Album Notes
 The Complete Louis Armstrong Decca Sessions (1935–1946)
 Dan Morgenstern, album notes writer (Louis Armstrong)
 Dance-O-Mania: Harry Yerkes And The Dawn of the Jazz Age, 1919–1923
 Mark Berresford, album notes writer (The Happy Six)
 Gonzo: The Life and Work of Dr. Hunter S. Thompson - Music From The Film
 Douglas Brinkley & Johnny Depp, album notes writers (Various Artists)
 My Dusty Road
 Ed Cray & Bill Nowlin, album notes writers (Woody Guthrie)
 Origins of the Red Hot Mama, 1910–1922
 Lloyd Ecker & Susan Ecker, album notes writers (Sophie Tucker)

 Historical 
Best Historical Album
 The Complete Chess Masters (1950–1967) Andy McKaie, compilation producer; Erick Labson, mastering engineer (Little Walter)
 My Dusty Road Scott Billington, Michael Creamer & Bill Nowlin, compilation producers; Doug Pomeroy, mastering engineer (Woody Guthrie)
 Origins of the Red Hot Mama, 1910-1922 Meagan Hennessey & Richard Martin, compilation producers; Richard Martin, mastering engineer (Sophie Tucker)
 Take Me to the Water: Immersion Baptism In Vintage Music And Photography 1890-1950 Steven Lance Ledbetter & Jim Linderman, compilation producers; Robert Vosgien, mastering engineer (Various Artists)
 Woodstock: 40 Years On: Back to Yasgur's Farm Cheryl Pawelski, Mason Williams & Andy Zax, compilation producers; Dave Schultz, mastering engineer (Various Artists)

 Production, non-classical 

 Best Engineered Album, Non Classical
 Ellipse Imogen Heap, engineer (Imogen Heap)
 Gossip in the Grain Ethan Johns & Dominic Monks, engineers (Ray LaMontagne)
 My One and Only Thrill Helik Hadar & Al Schmitt, engineers (Melody Gardot)
 Safe Trip Home Jon Brion, Grippa, Greg Koller and Jim Scott, engineers (Dido)
 Swan Feathers Richard Alderson, Chris Allen, Roman Klun, Lawrence Manchester, Rob Mounsey, Jay Newland, Gene Paul, Jamie Polaski & Gordie Sampson, engineers (Leslie Mendelson)

 Producer of the Year, Non Classical
 Brendan O'Brien
 Black Ice (AC/DC) (A) Crack the Skye (Mastodon) (A) "The Fixer" (Pearl Jam) (S) Killswitch Engage (Killswitch Engage) (A) Working on a Dream (Bruce Springsteen) (A) T Bone Burnett
 Moonalice (Moonalice)(A)
 Secret, Profane & Sugarcane (Elvis Costello) (A)
 Ethan Johns
 Gossip in the Grain (Ray LaMontagne) (A)
 Larry Klein
 "Acadian Driftwood" (Zachary Richard) (T)
 Bare Bones (Madeleine Peyroux) (A)
 My One and Only Thrill (Melody Gardot) (A)
 Our Bright Future (Tracy Chapman) (A)
 Tide (Luciana Souza) (A)
 Greg Kurstin
 It's Not Me, It's You (Lily Allen) (A)
 Ray Guns Are Not Just the Future (The Bird and the Bee) (A)

 Best Remixed Recording, Non-Classical
 "When Love Takes Over" (Electro Extended Remix) - David Guetta, remixer (David Guetta & Kelly Rowland) "Don't Believe in Love" (Dennis Ferrer Objektivity Mix) - Dennis Ferrer, remixer (Dido)
 "The Girl and the Robot" (Jean Elan Remix) - Jean Elan, remixer (Röyksopp)
 "I Want You" (Dave Audé Remix) - Dave Audé, remixer (Dean Coleman & DCLA)
 "No You Girls" (Trentemøller Remix) - Anders Trentemøller, remixer (Franz Ferdinand)

 Production, surround sound 
Best Surround Sound Album
 Transmigration Michael Bishop, surround mix engineer; Michael Bishop, surround mastering engineer; Elaine Martone, surround producer (Robert Spano, Atlanta Symphony Orchestra & Choruses)
 Colabs David Miles Huber, surround mix engineer; David Miles Huber, surround mastering engineer; David Miles Huber, surround producer (David Miles Huber, Allen Hart, DJ Muad'Deep, Seren Wen, Musetta, Henta, Marcell Marias & Gail Pettis)
 Flute Mystery Morten Lindberg & Hans Peter L'Orange, surround mix engineers; Morten Lindberg, surround mastering engineer; Morten Lindberg, surround producer (Emily Beynon, Vladimir Ashkenazy, Fred Johnny Berg, Catherine Beynon & Philharmonia Orchestra)
 Kleiberg: Treble & Bass Morten Lindberg & Hans Peter L'Orange, surround mix engineers; Morten Lindberg, surround mastering engineer; Morten Lindberg, surround producer (Daniel Reuss, Trondheim Symphony Orchestra, Marianne Thorsen & Göran Sjölin)
 Genesis 1970–1975 Nick Davis, surround mix engineer; Tony Cousins, surround mastering engineer; Nick Davis, surround producer (Genesis)

 Production, classical 

 Best Engineered Album, Classical
 Mahler: Symphony No. 8; Adagio From Symphony No. 10 - Peter Laenger, engineer (Michael Tilson Thomas & San Francisco Symphony) Britten: Billy Budd - Neil Hutchinson & Jonathan Stokes, engineers (Daniel Harding, Nathan Gunn, Ian Bostridge, Gidon Saks, Neal Davies, Jonathan Lemalu, Matthew Rose, London Symphony Chorus & London Symphony Orchestra)
 QSF Plays Brubeck - Judy Kirschner, engineer (Quartet San Francisco)
 Ravel: Daphnis Et Chloé - Jesse Lewis & John Newton, engineers (James Levine, Tanglewood Festival Chorus & Boston Symphony Orchestra)
 Shostakovich: Symphonies Nos. 1 & 15 - John Newton & Dirk Sobotka, engineers (Valery Gergiev & Orchestra of the Mariinsky Theatre)

 Producer of the Year, Classical
 Steven Epstein Adams: Doctor Atomic Symphony (David Robertson & Saint Louis Symphony Orchestra) Bernstein: Mass (Marin Alsop, Jubilant Sykes, Asher Edward Wulfman, Morgan State University Choir, Peabody Children's Chorus & Baltimore Symphony Orchestra) Corigliano: A Dylan Thomas Trilogy (Leonard Slatkin, George Mabry, Sir Thomas Allen, Nashville Symphony Chorus & Nashville Symphony Orchestra) Fauré: Piano Quintets (Fine Arts Quartet & Cristina Ortiz) Yo-Yo Ma & Friends: Songs Of Joy And Peace (Yo-Yo Ma & Various Artists) Blanton Alspaugh
 Carlson, David: Anna Karenina (Stewart Robertson, Christine Abraham, Sarah Colburn, Robert Gierlach, Christian Van Horn, Kelly Kaduce, Opera Theatre Of Saint Louis & Saint Louis Symphony Orchestra)
 Menotti: Amahl And The Night Visitors; My Christmas (Alastair Willis, Ike Hawkersmith, Kirsten Gunlogson, Dean Anthony, Todd Thomas, Kevin Short, Bart LeFan, Chicago Symphony Chorus, Nashville Symphony Chorus & Nashville Symphony Orchestra)
 Ravel: L'Enfant Et Les Sortilèges (Alastair Willis, Julie Boulianne, Chicago Symphony Chorus, Chattanooga Boys Choir, Nashville Symphony Chorus & Nashville Symphony Orchestra)
 Schubert: Death And The Maiden (JoAnn Falletta &; Buffalo Philharmonic Orchestra)
 Sierra, Roberto: Missa Latina 'Pro Pace' (Andreas Delfs, Nathaniel Webster, Heidi Grant Murphy, Milwaukee Symphony Chorus & Milwaukee Symphony Orchestra)
 John Fraser
 Britten: Billy Budd (Daniel Harding, Nathan Gunn, Ian Bostridge, Gidon Saks, Neal Davies, Jonathan Lemalu, Matthew Rose, London Symphony Chorus & London Symphony Orchestra)
 Midsummer Night (Kate Royal, Edward Gardner, Crouch End Festival Chorus & Orchestra Of English National Opera)
 Schubert: Schwanengesang (Ian Bostridge & Antonio Pappano)
 Shadows Of Silence (Leif Ove Andsnes, Franz Welzer-Möst & Sinfonieorchester Des Bayerischen Rundfunks)
 David Frost
 An American Journey (Eroica Trio)
 Journey to the New World (Sharon Isbin, Mark O'Connor & Joan Baez)
 Korngold: Violin Concerto; Schauspiel Overture; Much Ado About Nothing (Philippe Quint, Carlos Miguel Prieto & Orquesta Sinfonica de Mineria)
 Mozart: Piano Concertos 21 & 22 (Jonathan Biss & Orpheus Chamber Orchestra)
 O'Connor, Mark: String Quartets Nos. 2 & 3 (Ida Kavafian, Mark O'Connor, Paul Neubauer & Matt Haimovitz)
 James Mallinson
 MacMillan, James: St. John Passion (Sir Colin Davis, Christopher Maltman, London Symphony Chorus & London Symphony Orchestra)
 Mahler: Symphony No. 8 (Valery Gergiev, Choir Of Eltham College, Choral Arts Society of Washington, London Symphony Chorus & London Symphony Orchestra)
 Shostakovich: Symphonies Nos. 1 & 15 (Valery Gergiev & Orchestra Of The Mariinsky Theatre)
 Shostakovich: The Nose (Valery Gergiev, Andrei Popov, Sergei Semishkur, Vladislav Sulimsky, Chorus Of The Mariinsky Theatre & Orchestra Of The Mariinsky Theatre)

 Classical 

 Best Classical Album
 Mahler: Symphony No. 8; Adagio From Symphony No. 10 Michael Tilson Thomas, conductor; Ragnar Bohlin, Kevin Fox & Susan McMane, choir directors; Andreas Neubronner, producer; Peter Laenger, engineer/mixer; Andreas Neubronner, mastering engineer (Laura Claycomb, Anthony Dean Griffey, Katarina Karnéus, Quinn Kelsey, James Morris, Yvonne Naef, Elza van den Heever & Erin Wall; San Francisco Symphony; Pacific Boychoir, San Francisco Girls Chorus & San Francisco Symphony Chorus)
 Bernstein: Mass Marin Alsop, conductor; Jubilant Sykes; Steven Epstein, producer; Richard King, engineer/mixer (Asher Edward Wulfman; Baltimore Symphony Orchestra; Morgan State University Choir & Peabody Children's Chorus)
 Ravel: Daphnis et Chloé James Levine, conductor; Elizabeth Ostrow, producer; Jesse Lewis & John Newton, engineers/mixers; Mark Donahue, mastering engineer (Boston Symphony Orchestra; Tanglewood Festival Chorus)
 Ravel: L'Enfant et les Sortilèges Alastair Willis, conductor; Julie Boulianne; Blanton Alspaugh, producer; Mark Donahue & John Hill, engineers/mixers (Nashville Symphony Orchestra; Chattanooga Boys Choir, Chicago Symphony Chorus & Nashville Symphony Chorus)
 Shostakovich: The Nose Valery Gergiev, conductor; Andrei Popov, Sergei Semishkur & Vladislav Sulimsky; James Mallinson, producer; John Newton & Dirk Sobotka, engineers/mixers; Mark Donahue, mastering engineer (Orchestra of the Mariinsky Theatre; Chorus of the Mariinsky Theatre)

 Best Orchestra Performance
 "Ravel: Daphnis Et Chloé"
 James Levine, conductor (Boston Symphony Orchestra; Tanglewood Festival Chorus)
 "Berlioz: Symphonie Fantastique"
 Simon Rattle, conductor (Susan Graham; Berliner Philharmoniker)
 "Bruckner: Symphony No. 5"
 Benjamin Zander, conductor (Philharmonia Orchestra)
 "Shostakovich: Symphonies Nos. 1 & 15"
 Valery Gergiev, conductor (Orchestra of the Mariinsky Theatre)
 "Szymanowski: Symphonies Nos. 1 & 4"
 Antoni Wit, conductor (Jan Krzysztof Broja, Ewa Marczyk & Marek Marczyk; Warsaw Philharmonic Orchestra)

 Best Opera Recording
 "Britten: Billy Budd"
 Daniel Harding, conductor; Ian Bostridge, Neal Davies, Nathan Gunn, Jonathan Lemalu, Matthew Rose & Gidon Saks; John Fraser, producer (London Symphony Orchestra; Gentlemen of the London Symphony Chorus)
 "Messiaen: Saint François D'Assise"
 Ingo Metzmacher, conductor; Armand Arapian, Hubert Delamboye, Rod Gilfry, Henk Neven, Tom Randle & Camilla Tilling; Ferenc van Damme, producer (The Hague Philharmonic; Chorus of de Nederlandse Opera)
 "Musto, John: Volpone"
 Sara Jobin, conductor; Lisa Hopkins, Joshua Jeremiah, Museop Kim, Jeremy Little, Rodell Rosel & Faith Sherman; Blanton Alspaugh, producer (Wolf Trap Opera Company)
 "Shostakovich: The Nose"
 Valery Gergiev, conductor; Andrei Popov, Sergei Semishkur & Vladislav Sulimsky; James Mallinson, producer (Orchestra of the Mariinsky Theatre; Chorus of the Mariinsky Theatre)
 "Tan Dun: Marco Polo"
 Tan Dun, conductor; Stephen Bryant, Sarah Castle, Zhang Jun, Nancy Allen Lundy, Stephen Richardson & Charles Workman; Ferenc van Damme, producer (Netherlands Chamber Orchestra; Cappella Amsterdam)

 Best Choral Performance
 "Mahler: Symphony No. 8; Adagio From Symphony No. 10"
 Michael Tilson Thomas, conductor; Ragnar Bohlin, Kevin Fox & Susan McMane, choir directors (Laura Claycomb, Anthony Dean Griffey, Elza van den Heever, Katarina Karnéus, Quinn Kelsey, James Morris, Yvonne Naef & Erin Wall; San Francisco Symphony; Pacific Boychoir, San Francisco Symphony Chorus & San Francisco Girls Chorus)
 "Handel: Coronation Anthems"
 Harry Christophers, conductor (Alastair Ross; The Sixteen Orchestra; The Sixteen)
 "Penderecki: Utrenja"
 Antoni Wit, conductor (Gennady Bezzubenkov, Iwona Hossa, Piotr Kusiewicz, Piotr Nowacki & Agnieszka Rehlis; Warsaw Philharmonic Orchestra; Warsaw Boys' Choir & Warsaw Philharmonic Choir)
 "Song of the Stars: Granados, Casals & Blancafort"
 Dennis Keene, conductor (Erica Kiesewetter; Mark Kruczek & Douglas Riva; Voices Of Ascension)
 "A Spotless Rose"

Paul McCreesh, conductor (The Gabrieli Consort)

 Best Instrumental Soloist(s) Performance (With Orchestra)
 "Prokofiev: Piano Concertos Nos. 2 & 3"
 Vladimir Ashkenazy, conductor; Evgeny Kissin (Philharmonia Orchestra)
 "Bartók: 3 Concertos"
 Pierre Boulez, conductor (Pierre-Laurent Aimard, Yuri Bashmet, Gidon Kremer, Neil Percy, Tamara Stefanovich & Nigel Thomas; Berliner Philharmoniker & London Symphony Orchestra)
 "Bermel, Derek: Voices For Solo Clarinet And Orchestra"
 Gil Rose, conductor; Derek Bermel (Boston Modern Orchestra Project)
 "Korngold: Violin Concerto In D Major, Op. 35"
 Carlos Miguel Prieto, conductor; Philippe Quint (Orquesta Sinfónica de Mineria)
 "Salonen, Esa-Pekka: Piano Concerto"
 Esa-Pekka Salonen, conductor; Yefim Bronfman (Los Angeles Philharmonic)

 Best Instrumental Soloist Performance (Without Orchestra)
 "Journey to the New World" - Sharon Isbin (Joan Baez & Mark O'Connor)
 "Caroline Goulding" - Caroline Goulding (Christopher O'Riley & Janine Randall)
 Chopin" - Maria João Pires
 "Oppens Plays Carter" - Ursula Oppens
 "Sonatas & Etudes" - Yuja Wang

 Best Chamber Music Performance
 "Intimate Letters" - Emerson String Quartet
 "Ginastera: String Quartets" (Complete)- Enso Quartet (Lucy Shelton)
 "The Hungarian Album" - Guarneri Quartet
 "Schumann/Bartók: The Berlin Recital" - Martha Argerich & Gidon Kremer
 "Takemitsu, Toru: And Then I Knew 'Twas Wind" - Yolanda Kondonassis, Cynthia Phelps & Joshua Smith

 Best Small Ensemble Performance
 "Lang, David: The Little Match Girl Passion"
 Paul Hillier, conductor; Ars Nova Copenhagen & Theatre Of Voices
 "Bach: Orchestral Suites For A Young Prince"
 Monica Huggett, conductor; Gonzalo X. Ruiz; Ensemble Sonnerie
 "Josquin: Missa Malheur Me Bat"
 Peter Phillips, conductor; Tallis Scholars
 "Song Of Songs"
 Stile Antico (Alison Hill & Benedict Hymas)
 "Vivaldi: Concertos"
 Daniel Hope & Anne Sofie von Otter; Chamber Orchestra Of Europe (Kristian Bezuidenhout)

 Best Classical Vocal Performance
 "Verismo Arias" - Renée Fleming (Marco Armiliato; Jonas Kaufmann; Orchestra Sinfonica Di Milano Giuseppe Verdi; Coro Sinfonica Di Milano Giuseppe Verdi)
 "Bach" - Anne Sofie von Otter (Lars Ulrik Mortensen; Anders J. Dahlin, Jakob Bloch Jespersen, Tomas Medici & Karin Roman; Concerto Copenhagen)
 "Bel Canto Spectacular" - Juan Diego Flórez (Daniel Oren; Daniella Barcellona, Patrizia Ciofi, Plácido Domingo, Mariusz Kwiecien, Anna Netrebko & Fernando Piqueras; Orquestra de la Comunitat Valenciana; Cor de la Generalitat Valenciana)
 "Recital at Ravinia" - Lorraine Hunt Lieberson (Drew Minter; Peter Serkin)
 "Un Frisson Français" - Susan Graham (Malcolm Martineau)

 Best Classical Contemporary Composition
 "Higdon, Jennifer: Percussion Concerto" - Jennifer Higdon (Marin Alsop)
 "Crumb, George: The Winds Of Destiny" - George Crumb (James Freeman)
 "Pärt, Arvo: In Principio" - Arvo Pärt (Tõnu Kaljuste)
 "Sierra, Roberto: Missa Latina 'Pro Pace'" - Roberto Sierra (Andreas Delfs)
 "Wyner, Yehudi: Piano Concerto "Chiavi In Mano"" - Yehudi Wyner (Robert Spano)

 Best Classical Crossover Album
 'Yo-Yo Ma & Friends: Songs of Joy & Peace - Yo-Yo Ma (Odair Assad, Sergio Assad, Chris Botti, Dave Brubeck, Matt Brubeck, John Clayton, Paquito d'Rivera, Renée Fleming, Diana Krall, Alison Krauss, Natalie McMaster, Edgar Meyer, Cristina Pato, Joshua Redman, Jake Shimabukuro, Silk Road Ensemble, James Taylor, Chris Thile, Wu Tong, Alon Yavnai and Amelia Zirin-Brown) A Company of Voices: Conspirare in Concert
 Craig Hella Johnson, conductor; Conspirare (Tom Burritt, Ian Davidson & Bion Tsang)
 Jazz-Clazz - Paquito D'Rivera Quintet (Trio Clarone)
 The Melody Of Rhythm
 Leonard Slatkin, conductor; Béla Fleck, Zakir Hussain & Edgar Meyer (Detroit Symphony Orchestra)
 QSF Plays Brubeck - Quartet San Francisco
 Twelve Songs by Charles Ives
 Theo Bleckmann; Kneebody

 Music video 

 Best Short Form Music Video
 "Boom Boom Pow" – The Black Eyed Peas Mat Cullen & Mark Kudsi, video directors; Anna Joseph & Patrick Nugent, video producers
 "Mr. Hurricane" – Beast
 Ben Steiger Levine, video director; Sach Baylin-Stern, video producer
 "Life in Technicolor II" – Coldplay
 Dougal Wilson, video director; Matthew Fone, video producer
 "Wrong" – Depeche Mode
 Patrick Daughters, video director; Jonathan Lia, video producer
 "Her Morning Elegance" – Oren Lavie
 Oren Lavie, Merav Nathan and Yuval Nathan, video directors; Oren Lavie, video producer

 Best Long Form Music Video
 "The Beatles Love – All Together Now" – Various Artists Adrian Wills, video director; Martin Bolduc and Jonathan Clyde, video producers "In Boston" – Chris Botti
 Jim Gable, video director; Bobby Colomby, video producer
 "Johnny Cash's America" – Johnny Cash
 Robert Gordon & Morgan Neville, video directors; Robert Gordon and Morgan Neville, video producers
 "Anita O'Day – The Life of a Jazz Singer" – Anita O'Day
 Robbie Cavolina & Ian McCrudden, video directors; Robbie Cavolina, Melissa Davis & Ian McCrudden, video producers
 "Love, Pain & The Whole Crazy World Tour Live" – Keith Urban
 Chris Hicky, video director; Blake Morrison, video producer

 Special merit awards 

 MusiCares Person of the Year
 Neil Young Lifetime Achievement Award Winners
 Leonard Cohen
 Bobby Darin (posthumous)
 David "Honeyboy" Edwards
 Michael Jackson (posthumous)
 Loretta Lynn
 André Previn
 Clark Terry

 Trustees Award Winners
 Harold Bradley Florence Greenberg Walter C. Miller Technical Grammy Award Winners
 AKG Thomas Alva Edison President's Merit Award
 Doug Morris Kenny Burrell Ken Ehrlich Plácido Domingo' Artists with multiple nominations and awards 

The following artists received nominations more than two:

 Ten: Beyoncé
 Eight: Taylor Swift
 Six: The Black Eyed Peas, Maxwell, and Kanye West
 Five: Jay-Z
 Four: Kings of Leon, Lady Gaga
 Three: Colbie Caillat, Eminem

 In Memoriam 

A tribute to the music personalities lost in 2009: Mary Travers, Mike Seeger, Kate McGarrigle, Alan W. Livingston, Allen Klein, Pop Winans, Sami Bradley, Willie Mitchell, Snooks Eaglin, Koko Taylor, Louie Bellson, Gerry Niewood, Sam Butera, Hank Crawford, Dan Seals, Kenny Rankin,  Vern Gosdin, Shelby Singleton, Larry Knechtel, Barry Beckett, Teddy Pendergrass, Hal Gaba, Skip Miller, Uriel Jones, Jim Dickinson, DJ AM, Stephen Bruton, Jay Bennett, Vic Chesnutt, Bob Bogle, Tom Wilkes, Maurice Jarre, Vic Mizzy, Ali Akbar Khan, George Russell, Arthur Ferrante, Lukas Foss, Erich Kunzel, Alicia de Larrocha, Wilma Cozart Fine, Mercedes Sosa, Orlando "Cachaíto" López, Ellie Greenwich, Greg Ladanyi, Al Martino, Pierre Cossette and Les Paul.

Note: Michael Jackson and Les Paul were given special tributes.

Notes
 "The Climb", written by Jessi Alexander and Jon Mabe and featured in Hannah Montana: The Movie'', was originally nominated but was withdrawn by Walt Disney Records because it had not been written specifically for a film as the category's eligibility rules require. NARAS released a statement thanking Disney for its honesty and announcing that "The Climb" had been replaced by "All Is Love", with the fifth highest initial votes.

References

External links 
 Complete list of nominees and winners
 NARAS
 Fields and categories
 CBS GRAMMY Site

 052
2010 in American music
2010 music awards
2010 in Los Angeles
Grammy
January 2010 events in the United States